The Parliamentary Left Group is a left-wing political group in the Central American Parliament, or PARLACEN, made up of four regional leftist political parties. The organization's president and vice-president are Aura Lily Escobar Anléu of Guatemala and Carlos Luis Sánchez Soliman of the Dominican Republic, respectively. It holds thirty seats in the Central American Parliament.

Members

See also
Center-Democratic Integration Group
Central American Parliament

References

Politics of Central America
1991 establishments in North America